Shahib Masnawi (born 4 Aug 2000) is a Singaporean footballer who last played as a defender for Tanjong Pagar United.

Club

Young Lions FC 
He signed for Young Lions in 2020.

Tanjong Pagar United 
He signed for Tanjong Pagar United for the 2021 season.

Personal life
His brother, Syahadat Masnawi, is also a footballer playing for Tanjong Pagar United.

Career statistics

Club
 

Notes

References

External links

2000 births
Living people
Singaporean footballers
Association football midfielders
Singapore Premier League players
Albirex Niigata Singapore FC players